Florian Gerster (born 7 May 1949 in Worms, Germany) is a German politician and former government official.

After his graduation, he served in the military and earned a master's degree in psychology at the University of Mannheim. In 1977, he was elected to the Diet of Rhineland-Palatinate and entered the German Bundestag in 1987, representing Worms. From 1991 onwards, he was appointed Minister for Federal and European Affairs and thereafter Minister of Labor of Rhineland Palatinate. From 2002 until his resignation in 2004, he served as President of the Federal Employment Agency of Germany. Today, Gerster is a senior lecturer at the German University of Administrative Sciences Speyer and works as a freelance management consultant. He is the brother of ZDF heute news speaker Petra Gerster.

References

1949 births
Living people
Politicians from Rhineland-Palatinate
University of Mannheim alumni
Members of the Bundestag for Rhineland-Palatinate
Members of the Bundestag 1990–1994
People from Worms, Germany
Members of the Bundestag for the Social Democratic Party of Germany